Robert Francis "Bobcat" Goldthwait (born May 26, 1962) is an American actor, comedian, director and screenwriter, known for his black comedy stand-up act, delivered through an energetic stage persona with an unusual raspy and high-pitched voice. He came to prominence with his stand-up specials An Evening with Bobcat Goldthwait—Share the Warmth and Bob Goldthwait—Is He Like That All the Time? and his acting roles, including Zed in the Police Academy franchise and Eliot Loudermilk in Scrooged. Since 2012, he has been a regular panelist on the radio-quiz show, Wait Wait... Don't Tell Me!.

Goldthwait has written and directed a number of films and television series, most notably the black comedies Shakes the Clown (1991), in which he also starred, Sleeping Dogs Lie (2006), World's Greatest Dad (2009), God Bless America (2011), and the horror film Willow Creek (2013); episodes of Chappelle's Show, The Larry Sanders Show, Jimmy Kimmel Live! (2004–07), and Maron (2013–15); and several stand-up specials, including Patton Oswalt: Tragedy Plus Comedy Equals Time (2014).

He has also worked extensively as a voice actor, with voice roles in Capitol Critters (1992–95), Hercules (1997), and Hercules: The Animated Series (1998–99), and has provided the voice of Pop Fizz in the Skylanders video game series since the character's debut in 2012's Skylanders: Giants.

Early life
Robert Francis Goldthwait was born on May 26, 1962, in Syracuse, New York, the son of Kathleen Ann (Welch), a department store employee, and Thomas Lincoln Goldthwait, a sheet metal worker. He was raised in a working-class Catholic family.

At an early age, Goldthwait decided on a career as a comedian, inspired by enjoying making his friends laugh. During his time at St. Matthew's Grammar School, Goldthwait would host performances for his friends regularly, among them being future voice actor Tom Kenny. Goldthwait would experiment with new content, and developed a strong liking for props.

In 1980, Goldthwait and Kenny graduated from Bishop Grimes Junior/Senior High School in East Syracuse, New York. They formed a comedy troupe  called The Generic Comics. In their mid-teens, they saw an ad for an open-mic night in Skaneateles that featured comedian Barry Crimmins with the moniker "Bear Cat". He and Kenny went to the event and performed under the monikers Bobcat and Tomcat, respectively, as a tribute to Crimmins. Early in his career, Goldthwait also co-wrote with Martin Olson, who is listed as writer on his first two comedy specials Share the Warmth and Don't Watch This Show.

Career

Stand-up
Goldthwait became recognized as a solo stand-up comedian and had a record "Meat Bob" and two televised concert specials in the 1980s: An Evening with Bobcat Goldthwait —Share the Warmth and Bob Goldthwait —Is He Like That All the Time? He became known for his unique brand of comedy, which combines elements of political satire and often bizarre or unsettling black comedy.

During the fall of 1993, Goldthwait performed stand-up material as an opening act for Nirvana on what would be their final North American tour. He had been selected for the slot due to frontman Kurt Cobain being a fan of his comedy, and the two developed a friendship over the course of the tour. He also appeared in a promo video for the band's album In Utero and once fooled an interviewer during a phone interview, impersonating Dave Grohl. At midnight on New Year's Eve 1993, Goldthwait rappelled nude from a catwalk of the stage at the Oakland Coliseum as Kurt Cobain led a countdown.

Goldthwait filmed a half-hour HBO special in 1995, and another comedy album in 2003 I Don't Mean to Insult You, But You Look Like Bobcat Goldthwait and in 2004 his stand-up was featured in Comedy Central's animated series Shorties Watchin' Shorties. Goldthwait announced his retirement from stand-up in 2005 and performed a "final" run in Vegas in September 2005; he briefly resumed touring in early 2008 (from January through April); he performed again in 2009, doing stand-up in Winnipeg on April 3 and 4, and again in Omaha on August 28 and 29; he returned to Winnipeg for four shows on April 9 and 10, 2010. He released a one-hour stand-up special in 2011 You Don't Look the Same Either.

Acting
Goldthwait and Robin Williams appeared on the same bill together, but not as a comedy team, using the names "Jack Cheese" and "Marty Fromage". Goldthwait used the name Jack Cheese when he appeared in Tapeheads; when Williams made a cameo as Mime Jerry in Goldthwait's Shakes the Clown, he was billed as Marty Fromage.

Goldthwait has appeared in several films. His first major role was Zed in the  Police Academy franchise. He starred in One Crazy Summer, Burglar, Scrooged and Hot to Trot. In 1992, Goldthwait directed, wrote, and starred in Shakes the Clown. He also made an appearance as a writer in Radioland Murders.

In 1985, Goldthwait appeared in Twisted Sister's official video to "Leader of the Pack" and "Be Chrool to Your Scuel" from Come Out and Play.

In 1992, Goldthwait appeared as a guest-co-host of the second episode of The Ben Stiller Show.  He also appeared as a relative of Peggy Bundy on the Married... with Children show where he and his wife dropped one of their numerous offspring on the Bundys.

Guest appearances and controversy
Goldthwait appeared on Late Night with Conan O'Brien in 1993, where he tossed furniture and ran around the set, then into the audience.

As a guest on one of the last episodes of The Arsenio Hall Show in April 1994, Goldthwait became demonstrably upset that the program was being cancelled. At the time, it was widely believed that Paramount Studios had refused to renew Hall's contract because Late Night with David Letterman was moving to CBS, and Goldthwait took his anger out on Paramount. He stood on the set's couch, spray-painted "Paramount Sucks" on a glass wall, and threw video equipment around the studio. Hall was forced to try to restrain Goldthwait and security was called to the set.

On May 9, 1994, Goldthwait appeared on The Tonight Show with Jay Leno, where he briefly lit the guest chair on fire. As a result, he was fined $2,700 plus the cost of the chair ($698); he was also required to tape several public-service announcements about fire safety. Due to this incident, he is a convicted arsonist. Despite banishment rumors, Leno invited Goldthwait to appear seven days later for a bit with Goldthwait buried up to his neck in dirt.

These incidents were later the basis of the plot for his subsequent appearance on The Larry Sanders Show in August 1994, where the fictional talk show hires him in the hope of improving their ratings if he does another stunt. They also inspired a pseudo-fire safety PSA on MadTV.

Later work 
He was in four episodes of Space Ghost Coast to Coast: "Bobcat", "Surprise", "Anniversary" and an uncredited appearance in the episode, "Kentucky Nightmare".

One of the most recognizable features of Goldthwait's performances is his voice. He has voiced characters on the television series Capitol Critters (1992), The Moxy Show (1993-1995), Unhappily Ever After (1995–1999), The Tick (1995), Hercules, Hercules: The Animated Series (1998–1999), Lilo & Stitch: The Series (2003–2006), and Buzz Lightyear of Star Command (2000). Goldthwait has also appeared as himself hosting the comedy quiz show Bobcat's Big Ass Show (1998).  Goldthwait was also a semi-regular guest in the later seasons of the Tom Bergeron-version of Hollywood Squares in 1998.

Goldthwait was a featured guest on the August 20, 2009, episode of Adam Carolla's podcast. And on August 26, 2009, he returned to guest on Jimmy Kimmel Live! with old friend Robin Williams during which he revealed a tattoo on his buttocks of an anthropomorphized cymbal with a mustache and slanted eyes (a pun on the Chinese symbol tattoo).

Goldthwait appeared in September 2010 on an episode of LA Ink, where shop owner Kat Von D gave him a tattoo of a potato, impaled on a fork, on his upper right arm. Goldthwait chose the design to remind himself of where he came from and to tell close friends and family that he had not lost his sense of humor. He also displayed his older tattoo of a cymbal with a moustache on his buttocks.

Goldthwait appeared on the May 4, 2012, episode of Real Time with Bill Maher. Goldthwait was a voice guest in Season 4 of Adventure Time, voicing Ed in the episode "Web Weirdos". Goldthwait appeared on NPR's Wait Wait... Don't Tell Me! on May 12, 2012, to talk about his movie God Bless America and play the game "Not My Job" (he won). He then made his debut as one of the show's panelists on the July 14, 2012.

In 2012, he voiced a character known as Pop Fizz, an overexcited gremlin chemist with the ability to drink his potion and become a rampaging monster, for the hit video game series Skylanders, starting with Skylanders: Giants. Pop Fizz appeared in Skylanders: SWAP Force as Super Gulp Pop Fizz, Skylanders: Trap Team as Fizzy Frenzy Pop Fizz, and Skylanders: Superchargers as Big Bubble Pop Fizz. He later reprised the role of Pop Fizz in the 2016 Netflix series Skylanders Academy. The show ended in 2018.

Directing
Goldthwait began directing Jimmy Kimmel Live! in 2004. While there, ratings for the show increased to over 2 million viewers per night, and jumped 50% with teens; however, in May 2006 Goldthwait left to pursue his film career. Goldthwait maintains contact with Kimmel and still directs for television and film.  He returned to directing segments for Jimmy Kimmel Live! in the summer of 2007.

Shakes the Clown
Shakes the Clown is a dark comedy about a birthday-party clown (Goldthwait) in the grip of depression and alcoholism, who is framed for murder. Different communities of clowns, mimes and other performers are depicted as clannish, rivalrous subcultures obsessed with precedence and status. This was Goldthwait's bitter satire of the dysfunctional standup comedy circuit he knew as a performer.

Sleeping Dogs Lie
Goldthwait's third feature film Sleeping Dogs Lie (originally titled Stay) starring Melinda Page Hamilton was in the 2006 Sundance Film Festival and was part of the "Independent Dramatic Features" competition. Sleeping Dogs Lie is about a youthful, impulsive instance of oral sex performed on a dog which opens the door to a black comedy about the complexities of honesty. It was also nominated for the Grand Jury Prize in the "Dramatic Features" category. The film was bought by Roadside Attractions & Samuel Goldwyn Films at the 2006 Sundance Film Festival for the North American rights to the film, and was released on October 20, 2006. Gaumont bought the international rights to the film. It was released on February 21, 2007, by Gaumont in France, and on March 16, 2007, in the UK. On May 4, 2007, it was presented as John Waters' annual selection of a favorite film within Maryland Film Festival.

World's Greatest Dad
Goldthwait's fourth feature film, World's Greatest Dad, was released on July 24, 2009, on video-on-demand providers before its limited theatrical release on August 21. It starred Robin Williams, Daryl Sabara, and Alexie Gilmore.  The web site for the 2009 Sundance Film Festival described it as a "lusciously perverse, and refreshingly original comedy that tackles love, loss, and our curious quest for infamy". Roger Ebert of the Chicago Sun-Times gave World's Greatest Dad 3 out of 4 stars, but commented that the material could have been even darker in its satire, and he questioned whether it was the director's intention.

God Bless America
God Bless America premiered at the 2011 Toronto International Film Festival and screened within Maryland Film Festival 2012.

Willow Creek
Willow Creek premiered at the 2013 Independent Film Festival of Boston and screened within such festivals as Maryland Film Festival. The film made its debut on the West Coast at the Arcata Theatre Lounge in Arcata, California, on May 31, 2013, near its filming location of Willow Creek, California.

On July 20, 2013, Willow Creek had its international premier at the Fantasia Festival in Montreal.

Cliff Barackman, a cast member of Animal Planet's Finding Bigfoot was originally in Willow Creek but due to editing, his scenes were cut from the film.

Call Me Lucky
In 2015, Goldthwait premiered Call Me Lucky, his documentary on the life and work of comedian/activist Barry Crimmins, at the Sundance Film Festival.

Joy Ride
In August 2019, Goldthwait and fellow comedian Dana Gould set out to film their two-person stand-up show, but the project was postponed when the pair was in an auto accident on the way to the first performance. After recovering, they were able to film four shows in February 2020. Joy Ride was released in October 2020 and received a 100% from Rotten Tomatoes.

Misfits & Monsters
On July 11, 2018, Goldthwait's anthology television series Bobcat Goldthwait's Misfits & Monsters premiered on truTV.

Personal life
Goldthwait has been married twice. His marriage to his first wife Ann Luly lasted from 1986 to 1998. They have a daughter, Tasha.

In 1997, he was engaged to Nikki Cox; their relationship ended in 2005.

Goldthwait was married to his second wife, Sarah de Sa Rego, from 2009 to 2014.

Goldthwait claims he has not consumed drugs or alcohol since he was 19.

Awards and honors
Goldthwait's film Windy City Heat won a Comedian Award for Best Comedy Film at Montreal's Just for Laughs Film Festival in 2009.

In June 2015, Bobcat Goldthwait was named "Filmmaker on the Edge" at the 17th Annual Provincetown International Film Festival. John Waters presented the prize.

Discography
 Meat Bob (1988) Chrysalis Records
 I Don't Mean to Insult You, but You Look Like Bobcat Goldthwait (September 23, 2003, Comedy Central Records)
 You Don't Look the Same Either (May 8, 2012, Comedy Central Records)

Filmography

Film

As director

As performer/himself

Television

References

External links

 
 Goldthwait film an odd tale
 2006 London Film Festival
 Bobcat Goldthwait: One Man & His Dog
 DVD Talk Audio Interview with Bobcat Goldthwait
 Louisville.com interview with Bobcat Goldthwait about the Internet's impact on cultural standards and the business of being a comedian
 Louisville.com interviews Bobcat Goldthwait about his new movie, "World's Greatest Dad"
 2010 interview with Stephen Applebaum
 Willow Creek, A Found Footage Bigfoot Film by Bobcat Goldthwait

1962 births
20th-century American comedians
20th-century American male actors
21st-century American comedians
21st-century American male actors
American atheists
American directors
American male comedians
American male film actors
American male screenwriters
American male television actors
American male voice actors
American male writers
American people convicted of arson
American stand-up comedians
American television directors
Chrysalis Records artists
Comedians from New York (state)
Comedy film directors
Film directors from New York (state)
Living people
Male actors from New York (state)
Male actors from Syracuse, New York
People from Syracuse, New York
Screenwriters from New York (state)
Writers from Syracuse, New York